The Eocrinoidea are an extinct class of echinoderms that lived between the Early Cambrian and Late Silurian periods. They are the earliest known group of stalked, arm-bearing echinoderms, and were the most common echinoderms during the Cambrian.

Eocrinoids were a paraphyletic group that may have been ancestral to six other classes: Rhombifera, Diploporita, Coronoidea, Blastoidea, Parablastoidea, and Paracrinoidea. They may also be the progenitors of the cystoids, who are believed to be ancestral to modern crinoids. The earliest genera had a short holdfast and irregularly structured plates. Later forms had a fully developed stalk with regular rows of plates. They were benthic suspension feeders, with five ambulacra on the upper surface, surrounding the mouth and extending into a number of narrow arms. An unusual Ordovician form was the conical Bolboporites with its single brachiole. See also List of echinodermata orders.

References

External links
Palaeos on Eocrinoids
Evolutionary palaeoecology of early epifaunal echinoderms
Cambrian explosion with Eocrinoid information

Blastozoa
Paleozoic echinoderms
Cambrian echinoderms
Silurian echinoderms
Cambrian first appearances
Silurian extinctions
 Paraphyletic groups